Rostislav Borisovich Plechko (Russian: Ростислав Борисович Плечко; born 5 January 1989) is a Russian professional boxer who currently holds the Russian and WBA Asia heavyweight titles.

Rostislav Plechko was born in Saint-Petersburg, Russia. A severe pelvis joint trauma was revealed at birth, and despite doctors recommending an urgent surgery, his parents decided to treat their son themselves, and at the age of six, he began walking without any restrictions. After achieving a sports degree in canoeing, he became the Saint-Petersburg City Canoeing champion making it to the final of Russia State Championship. He quit canoeing at the age of fourteen, and just two years later he was enrolled to SPBGU University, and began to attend boxing classes at the university's amateur boxing club.

Boxing career 

As an amateur boxer, Plechko was awarded the Saint-Petersburg heavyweight title. He made his professional boxing debut on February 27, 2016 after defeating Sedrak Agagulyan in the first round. Plechko went on to win nine additional fights (and all of which were knockouts within the first round), including victories against Evgeny Orlov and Bernard Adie. On June 10, 2017, Rostislav became the Russian heavyweight champion by stopping Vladimir Goncharov in the first round. After defeating Goncharov, Plechko went on to win the WBA Asia  heavyweight title from Ibrahim Labaran on September 7, 2017. In his most recent fight, Plechko stopped Brazilian heavyweight Irineu Beato Costa Junior in the first round. Plechko's professional record currently stands at 13 wins, 0 losses, 0 draws and 13 wins by knockout (all of which were stoppages in the first round). He also had a two out of five star rating on BoxRec but is currently unrated with his status listed as inactive, due to not having fought for over one full year.

Plechko is currently coached by Alexander Zimin (Russian: Александр Зимин).

Professional boxing record

References

Russian male boxers
Russian sportsmen
Heavyweight boxers
1989 births
Living people
Northwestern Management Institute alumni